Niobrara National Forest was established as the Niobrara Forest Reserve by the General Land Office in Nebraska on April 16, 1902 with . After the transfer of federal forests to the U.S. Forest Service in 1905, it became a National Forest on March 4, 1907. On July 1, 1908 the entire forest was combined with Nebraska National Forest and the name was discontinued. In 1971, the Niobrara reserve was designated as the Samuel R. McKelvie National Forest.

References

External links
Forest History Society
Forest History Society:Listing of the National Forests of the United States Text from Davis, Richard C., ed. Encyclopedia of American Forest and Conservation History. New York: Macmillan Publishing Company for the Forest History Society, 1983. Vol. II, pp. 743-788.

Former National Forests of Nebraska
Protected areas established in 1902
1902 establishments in Nebraska
1908 disestablishments in Nebraska
Protected areas disestablished in 1908